Bergkvara AIF is a Swedish sports club located in Bergkvara. The club was founded in 1930.

External links 
 Bergkvara AIF - official site

Sports teams in Sweden